Sparaxis bulbifera, commonly known as harlequin flower, is a bulb-forming perennial plant. The species is native to Cape Province in South Africa and naturalised in the Azores and Australia. It grows to between 15 and 60 cm high and has white to cream flowers.

References

bulbifera
Endemic flora of South Africa
Flora of the Cape Provinces
Fynbos
Garden plants of Southern Africa
Flora naturalised in Australia